Aamra is a 2006 Indian Bengali-language film directed by Mainak Bhaumik and starring Jisshu Sengupta, Parambrata Chatterjee, and Nilanjana Sharma.

Plot
A movie for the youth, about the youth and by the youth. That's precisely what the makers of Aamra proclaims it to be. It is about six characters from diverse backgrounds and their take on love and sex. In fact it is also officially the first sex comedy in Bengali. As the story begins we find Amit Roy, Bhasha Chatterjee, Raj Mukherjee, Shreya Ghosal, Tapash Chatterjee and Sunaina Bannerjee talking about love. Everyone is talking about their first love, lover affairs and love making. Amit is a filmmaker. His first love was Rupa who was a married woman. But they had broken up. Tapash is an academician having an affair with Sunaina. Raj was Shreya's boyfriend but they broke up six months ago. Bhasha is a homemaker. Raj calls himself a future rockstar. They have a rock band. Shreya is a school teacher. Sunaina is a student. Amit and Shreya a suddenly meet in an internet chatroom. They go on a date. Raj also gets attracted to Sunaina. Amit feels an infatuation for Bhasha when she comes for an audition to him. Sunaina does not feel comfortable with Tapash anymore. Bhasha doubts Tapash and says that she wants a divorce. They get divorced. Everybody tries to understand their own actual feelings. They try to get perfect partners for themselves. Sunaina breaks up with Tapash and proposes to Raj. Shreya decides to go for an arranged marriage. Bhasha and Amit get close. Everybody finds the right partner. Amit is a telefilm director who has just had her girlfriend, older than he is and a wife and mother, walking out of their relationship. On a chat site he meets Shreya. Shreya, young, pretty and sexy, is a teacher in a junior high school. She has just dumped Raj who is a wannabe rockstar struggling to make it big. Raj hooks up Sunny, an undergraduate student in the same college/university, who has a secret relationship with Tapas, her English professor. Bhasha is the professor's wife with an aspiration for acting. She meets Amit for a drama audition and starts liking him in subsequent meets. Except Tapas who is 39, all others are in their early to late twenties.

Cast
 Jisshu Sengupta
 Parambrata Chatterjee
 Rudranil Ghosh
 Amarnath Mukherjee
 Ashok Biswanathan
 Pallavi Chatterjee
 Ananya Chatterjee
 Mithu Chakraborty
 Nilanjana Sharma (Sengupta)
 Priyam Dasgupta (Momo)

References

External links
 

2006 films
Bengali-language Indian films
2000s Bengali-language films
Films directed by Mainak Bhaumik